Spadina streetcar line may refer to:

 Spadina streetcar line (1923–48) an earlier streetcar line on Spadina.
 510 Spadina, a modern streetcar system, completed in 1997, running entirely in a dedicated right-of-way

See also
 Spadina (disambiguation)